Misattribution may refer to:
 Misattribution of arousal
 Misattribution of memory
 The misattribution theory of humor derived from work by Sigmund Freud
 False attribution, a deliberate or accidental association of authorship with the wrong person